P. S. Vidyadharan (popularly known as Vidyadharan master; Malayalam) is a music composer and playback singer who works in Malayalam cinema. In 2013, he completed 60 years of his musical career.

Early life
Vidyadharan was born on 6 March 1945 to Sankaran and Thankamma in Arattupuzha, Thrissur, as their eldest son. He has six siblings, the youngest of them being the popular music director and singer Natesh Shankar.

Vidyadharan learned classical music from kochakkan Assan(Grand father),
Irinjalakkuda Govindankutty Panicker, R Vaidyanatha Bhagavathar, and Sankaranarayana Bhagavathar. To fulfil his desire of becoming a playback singer, he later moved to Chennai. Music director G. Devarajan gave him an opportunity to sing the song "Oh rikshaavaala" in the 1965 film Odayil Ninnu. Based on Devarajan's advice, Vidyadharan returned home to continue his studies. He also started singing for stage dramas during this period.

His wife's name is Leela. Daughter-Sangeetha Vidhyadharan and Son-Sajith vidhyadharan,are his children. Anila is his daughter in law. Devi, Devadatta, Krishnajith, and Krithika are his grandchildren.

Music composer
Vidyadharan became an independent music director through the stage drama Baliyaadukal. He made his debut as film music director in the 1984 film Ente Gramam, directed by Sreemoolanagaram Vijayan. One of his popular songs, "Kalpantha kaalatholam", was composed for this film. "Nashtaswargangale" (Veena Poovu) and "Chandanam manakkunna" (Achuvettante Veedu) are among his other most popular film compositions.

In 2004, Vidyadharan received the Kerala Sangeetha Nataka Akademi Award. In 2017, Vidyadharan won the G. Devarajan Master Award, the Sarga-Sangeetha Prathibha Award, the Ranjith Kandaran Award, and the Mookambika Souparnikamrutham Award. In 2016, he received the Dakshinamoorthy Sangeetha Sumeru Award.

Popular compositions

Discography

Film discography

Independent album discography
 Alakananda Theeram

References

External links
 Interview with Vidyadharan
Paattinte Vazhi - Vidyadharan
 Malayalam:വിദ്യാധരൻ

Malayalam film score composers
Malayalam playback singers
Living people
Film musicians from Kerala
21st-century Indian composers
1945 births
Recipients of the Kerala Sangeetha Nataka Akademi Award